Rabbi Falk can refer to several people:
 Joshua Falk (1555–1614), Polish Halakhist and Talmudist
 Jacob Joshua Falk (1680–1756), Rabbi in Poland and Germany
 Hayyim Samuel Jacob Falk (1708–1782), British kabbalist known as the Baal Shem of London
 Pesach Eliyahu Falk, a posek in Gateshead